This is a list of VFL/AFL Grand Final records, as they apply to the history of the VFL/AFL Grand Final between 1898 and the present day.

Individual records

Team records

See also
AFL Grand Final
List of VFL/AFL records

References

External links
 AFL Tables

VFL AFL records
Australian rules football records and statistics
VFL/AFL Grand Finals